Sir David Joseph Dobbyn  (born 3 January 1957) is a New Zealand musician, singer–songwriter and record producer. In his early career he was a member of the rock group Th' Dudes and was the main creative force in pop band DD Smash. Since then he has released the majority of his recordings as a solo performer.

Early life 
Dave Dobbyn was born on 3 January 1957 in the working class area of Glen Innes, Auckland, the third of five children to tour-bus driver Terry Dobbyn and Molly. He was influenced by music from a young age, ranging from the Irish songs his father listened to, to the music of the church across the road, to the various radio stations he was able to pick up on the family radiogram. 

While his family had a piano at home, he was the only member to not receive piano lessons, something he was grateful for in retrospect as it meant he was able to come to it without memories of strict lessons. He, along with his three brothers, attended the local Catholic college Sacred Heart College, where he would meet Ian Morris and Peter Urlich. 

While Sacred Heart actively encouraged music, Dobbyn was too shy to be involved, and on graduating high school worked nine months as a bank teller, and applied to teachers' college twice, to be accepted on the second try. As he started teachers' college he was asked by Morris and Urlich to join the band that would become Th' Dudes.

Musical career

Th' Dudes (1975–1980) 

Dobbyn's first success came with rock band, Th' Dudes, which he joined as guitarist. After performing with the band for a year, Dobbyn quit teachers' college to focus on the band full-time. Dobbyn suffered extreme stage fright and played early performances standing at the back with his eyes closed. However, he took on the role of frontman for the song "Be Mine Tonight"  (1978). The song won single of the year in 1979 in New Zealand and led to many critics seeing him as the breakout star of the band. The band's 1980 song "Bliss" (1980) has become an iconic New Zealand drinking song.

DD Smash (1980–1986) 

After Th' Dudes disbanded in 1980, Dobbyn formed a pop group DD Smash. The band's first release was the single "Lipstick Power", followed by "Bull by the Horns" (1981), thought to be about Dobbyn overcoming the stage fright he sometimes experienced while performing with Th' Dudes. Their first album Cool Bananas (1982) debuted in the New Zealand charts at number one.

After Treavaun, DD smash released Deep in the Heart of Taxes (1983), an album recorded live at Auckland's popular eighties venue Mainstreet. Their final album, The Optimist (1984), although slicker sounding production-wise than its predecessor, showed signs of compromise with the dominant commercial, Blue-eyed soul inflected, synthpop sound of the post-new wave era of British and Australian music which was flooding the New Zealand charts at the time. Dobbyn apparently had his eye on the larger Australian market and it was not long before he had a number one solo hit there.

In December 1984, DD Smash was playing an outdoor concert in Aotea Square in Auckland. During their set, a power failure led sections of the crowd to become restless. Some of the crowd started throwing beer bottles and police arrested them. The situation escalated and the riot squad was called in. Dobbyn made negative remarks about the police which allegedly spurred on the crowd. The concert was stopped by the police and sections of the crowd rioted, smashing shop windows along Queen Street. Prime Minister David Lange called a commission of inquiry and as a result, Dobbyn was charged with inciting a riot. The criminal prosecution against Dobbyn began in June 1985. His lawyer successfully defended him and he was acquitted on the charge of "behaving in a manner likely to cause violence against person or property and using insulting language".

When DD Smash eventually disbanded, partially to make room for the commercially expanding vision of Dobbyn, they left behind them the hit singles "Outlook for Thursday" (1983) and the violin-tinged, hi perennial classic "Whaling" (1984).

Solo career (1986–present) 

When DD Smash folded, Dobbyn began a successful solo career, by writing the soundtrack music for the animated feature film Footrot Flats: The Dog's Tale in 1986. The film yielded two hit singles: "You Oughta Be In Love" (1986) and the chart-topping "Slice of Heaven" (1986) recorded with the band Herbs. After the release of the film, "Slice of Heaven" became one of Dobbyn's best-known songs, frequently used in tourism advertisements aired on Australian television that encouraged people to visit New Zealand. With the success of the song in Australia, Dobbyn settled in Australia.

In April 1987, a re-worked version of Dobbyn's song "Slice of Heaven" featured in a number of television commercials in Australia. Funded by the Australian Meat Industry Council (AMIC), the commercials promoted the Devon meat product by substituting the word "Heaven" for "Devon" in the chorus.

Dobbyn released his debut solo album Loyal, a personal celebration of love and loyalty, in 1988. 
His follow-up was the Mitchell Froom-produced Lament for the Numb (1993), which included members of Elvis Costello's one time backing band. The album was called "un-releasable" by Dobbyn's record label at the time and was shelved for a year until its eventual release. After nearly a decade in Australia, Dobbyn moved back to Auckland in the early 1990s, and made 1994's Twist with fellow New Zealander and recently returned singer-songwriter Neil Finn, whose contribution Dobbyn stated "was crucial to the sound of that record". Twist is also notable for its inclusion of the Maori singer Emma Paki, who was popular in the country at the time of the album's release.

In 1995 Dobbyn became one of the first musical performers in the world to simulcast a performance on the Internet. However, it was hindered by technical problems.

Dobbyn took on the role of producer in fourth solo album, The Islander. The album received widespread popular and critical acclaim, reaching number 1 on the New Zealand charts.

In 1999 Dobbyn joined Jan Hellriegel and Toi Iti to co-write "Read About It", the theme song of the Duffy Books in Homes programme which is still performed by 100,000 children annually.

Dobbyn's hit song "Loyal" (1988) from his debut solo album Loyal (1988) was used as an anthem for Team New Zealand's failed 2003 America's Cup defence. He has also produced albums for Australian singer Grant McLennan and contributed to albums by Jenny Morris, Gyan Evans, Wayne Gillespie and Bic Runga. In 2000 Dobbyn toured New Zealand with Runga and Tim Finn. The tour was recorded and the live album, Together in Concert: Live (2000) was released soon after. The tour also included the lead off song "Just Add Water" from his 2000 album Hopetown, a record Dobbyn has since referred to as "a cartoon album".

In 2005, Dobbyn released his sixth solo album; Available Light. The album received popular and critical acclaim. In the same year Dobbyn performed the lead single from Available Light, "Welcome Home" (2005) at the New Zealand Music Awards ceremony. During the performance, Ahmed Zaoui, who was appealing a security certificate issued due to alleged links to terrorist groups, appeared on stage with Dobbyn.

2008 saw Dobbyn release Anotherland. The album entered the NZ Top 40 Album Charts at Number 2 and remained in the charts for 6 weeks, eventually attaining Gold status.

In 2009 Dobbyn released a second greatest hits album, including re-recorded versions of "Devil You Know", "Shaky Isles" and "Whaling". The second CD includes less known songs. A limited edition version also included a DVD tracking his three decades in music, and included interviews with former bandmates and collaborators.

In 2012 Dobbyn was part of the all-star lineup for the Flight of the Conchords charity single Feel Inside.  The song debuted at number 1 on the New Zealand music chart and remained there for two weeks.

Discography

Solo studio albums

Compilation albums

Live albums

Singles

Notes

Awards and nominations 
Dobbyn has received numerous musical awards from both the New Zealand Music Awards and the APRA Silver Scroll Awards. In the 2003 New Year Honours, he was appointed an Officer of the New Zealand Order of Merit, for services to music. In the 2021 New Year Honours, Dobbyn was promoted to Knight Companion of the New Zealand Order of Merit, for services to music.

RIANZ Awards 
The New Zealand Music Awards are awarded annually by the RIANZ in New Zealand. As of 2012, Dobbyn has won 23 awards.

APRA Awards
As of 2013, Dobbyn has won 4 Silver Scroll Awards: 3 for the Silver Scroll Awards for songwriting, and 1 for the most performed work in New Zealand. He received a Lifetime Achievement award in 2001 at the NZ Music Awards. As of 2013 he is the only musician to win the Silver Scroll award three times (1987, 1993, 1998).

In 2001, a vote by members of APRA to find New Zealand's Top 100 songs (what would eventually become the Nature's Best series) included 10 Dobbyn songs. These were:

 3: Dave Dobbyn – "Loyal"
 7: Dave Dobbyn with Herbs – "Slice of Heaven"
 12: DD Smash – "Whaling"
 27: Th' Dudes – "Be Mine Tonight"
 29: Dave Dobbyn – "Beside You"
 31: DD Smash – "Outlook For Thursday"
 35: Dave Dobyyn – "Language"
 50: Th' Dudes – "Bliss"
 70: Dave Dobbyn – "You Oughta Be in Love"
 100: Dave Dobbyn – "Naked Flame"

ARIA Music Awards
The ARIA Music Awards is an annual awards ceremony that recognises excellence, innovation, and achievement across all genres of Australian music. They commenced in 1987.

|
|-
| rowspan="4"| 1988
| Dave Dobbyn
| ARIA Award for Best New Talent
| 
| rowspan="4"| 
|-
| rowspan="3"| "Slice of Heaven"
| ARIA Award for Single of the Year
| 
|-
| ARIA Award for Song of the Year
| 
|-
| ARIA Award for Highest Selling Single
| 
|-

Lifetime Achievement Award 
In 2001 the Recording Industry Association of New Zealand (RIANZ) awarded Dobbyn a rare Lifetime Achievement Award as part of the 2001 New Zealand Music Awards. The award presenter Michael Glading, the managing director of Sony New Zealand, chose to forego a speech and instead read out the titles of the long list of Dobbyn's hit songs.

Personal life
Dobbyn met his future wife, Anneliesje, at a Whangamata Th' Dudes New Year's show. They married in 1983. In October 2022, he revealed that he has Parkinson's Disease. Dobbyn said that this diagnosis, received in July 2022, has given him a 'wider appreciation of life'.

References

External links
 Official Website
 The Slow Boat Inquisition
 Homegrown Profiles: Dave Dobbyn, 2005 interview and retrospective
 The Dave Dobbyn Interview, 2009
 Biography (davedobbyn.co.nz) 
 Chris Bourke Biography for 2001 Overnight Success Greatest Hits
 1998 North and South interview

1957 births
APRA Award winners
Living people
New Zealand songwriters
Male songwriters
New Zealand pop singers
New Zealand guitarists
New Zealand male guitarists
New Zealand Christians
Knights Companion of the New Zealand Order of Merit
People educated at Sacred Heart College, Auckland
Singers awarded knighthoods
Māori-language singers